Balochistan National Party (Awami) is a minor political party in Balochistan, Pakistan with regionalist orientation. Israr Ullah Zehri is president of the party.

References

 
Baloch nationalist organizations
Political parties in Pakistan
Political parties with year of establishment missing